"She Walks in Beauty" is a short lyrical poem in iambic tetrameter written in 1814 by Lord Byron, and is one of his most famous works.

It is said to have been inspired by an event in Byron's life. On 11 June 1814, Byron attended a party in London. Among the guests was Mrs. Anne Beatrix Wilmot, wife of Byron's first cousin, Sir Robert Wilmot. He was struck by her unusual beauty, and the next morning the poem was written.

It is thought that she was the first inspiration for his unfinished epic poem about Goethe, a personal hero of his. In this unpublished work, which Byron referred to in his letters as his magnum opus, he switches the gender of Goethe and gives him the same description of his cousin.

Musical settings
The poem has inspired various composers over time, including Roger Quilter, Gerald Finzi, Toby Hession, Ivy Frances Klein, Jean Coulthard, Isaac Nathan, Nicolas Flagello, Sally Whitwell, and Eric Barnum. The British musical ensemble Mediaeval Baebes sing the complete poem on their 2015 album The Huntress.

References

External links 
 

Poetry by Lord Byron
1814 poems